This page lists all described species of the spider family Tetrablemmidae accepted by the World Spider Catalog :

A

Ablemma

Ablemma Roewer, 1963
 A. aiyura Shear, 1978 — New Guinea
 A. andriana Fardiansah & Dupérré, 2019 — Indonesia (Sumatra)
 A. baso Roewer, 1963 (type) — Indonesia (Sumatra)
 A. berryi Shear, 1978 — Caroline Is.
 A. circumspectans Deeleman-Reinhold, 1980 — Borneo
 A. contrita Fardiansah & Dupérré, 2019 — Indonesia (Sumatra)
 A. datahu Lehtinen, 1981 — Indonesia (Sulawesi)
 A. erna Lehtinen, 1981 — Indonesia (Sumatra)
 A. girinumu Lehtinen, 1981 — New Guinea
 A. gombakense Wunderlich, 1995 — Malaysia
 A. kaindi Lehtinen, 1981 — New Guinea
 A. k. avios Lehtinen, 1981 — New Guinea
 A. kelinci Fardiansah & Dupérré, 2019 — Indonesia (Sumatra)
 A. lempake Lehtinen, 1981 — Borneo
 A. makiling Lehtinen, 1981 — Philippines
 A. malacca Lin & Li, 2017 — Singapore
 A. merotai Lehtinen, 1981 — Borneo
 A. prominens Tong & Li, 2008 — China
 A. pugnax (Brignoli, 1973) — New Guinea, Solomon Is.
 A. rarosae Lehtinen, 1981 — Philippines
 A. ruohomaekii Lehtinen, 1981 — Thailand
 A. samarinda Lehtinen, 1981 — Borneo
 A. sedgwicki Shear, 1978 — Borneo
 A. shimojanai (Komatsu, 1968) — Japan (Ryukyu Is.)
 A. singalang Lehtinen, 1981 — Indonesia (Sumatra)
 A. sternofoveatum Lehtinen, 1981 — Borneo
 A. syahdani Lehtinen, 1981 — Borneo
 A. unicornis Burger, 2008 — Malaysia

Afroblemma

Afroblemma Lehtinen, 1981
 A. thorelli (Brignoli, 1974) (type) — Angola, Tanzania
 A. t. maniema Lehtinen, 1981 — Congo

Anansia

Anansia Lehtinen, 1981
 A. astaroth (Brignoli, 1974) (type) — Angola

B

Bacillemma

Bacillemma Deeleman-Reinhold, 1993
 B. leclerci Deeleman-Reinhold, 1993 (type) — Thailand

† Balticoblemma

† Balticoblemma Wunderlich, 2004
 † B. unicorniculum Wunderlich, 2004

† Bicornoculus

† Bicornoculus Wunderlich, 2015 - Tetrablemminae

Borneomma

Borneomma Deeleman-Reinhold, 1980
 B. roberti Deeleman-Reinhold, 1980 (type) — Malaysia (Borneo)
 B. yuata Lehtinen, 1981 — Indonesia (Borneo)

† Brignoliblemma

† Brignoliblemma Wunderlich, 2017 - Tetrablemminae

Brignoliella

Brignoliella Shear, 1978
 B. acuminata (Simon, 1889) (type) — New Caledonia
 B. beattyi Shear, 1978 — Caroline Is.
 B. besuchetiana Bourne, 1980 — India
 B. besutensis Lin, Li & Jäger, 2012 — Malaysia, SIngapore
 B. bicornis (Simon, 1893) — Philippines
 B. caligiformis Tong & Li, 2008 — China
 B. carmen Lehtinen, 1981 — Philippines
 B. dankobiensis Bourne, 1980 — Papua New Guinea (New Ireland)
 B. delphina Deeleman-Reinhold, 1980 — New Guinea
 B. klabati Lehtinen, 1981 — Indonesia (Sulawesi)
 B. leletina Bourne, 1980 — Papua New Guinea (New Ireland)
 B. maoganensis Tong & Li, 2008 — China
 B. maros Lehtinen, 1981 — Indonesia (Sulawesi)
 B. martensi (Brignoli, 1972) — Nepal
 B. massai Lehtinen, 1981 — Indonesia (Sulawesi)
 B. michaeli Lehtinen, 1981 — Malaysia, Singapore
 B. patmae Fardiansah & Dupérré, 2019 — Indonesia (Sumatra)
 B. quadricornis (Roewer, 1963) — Caroline Is.
 B. ratnapura Shear, 1988 — Sri Lanka
 B. sarawak Shear, 1978 — Borneo
 B. scrobiculata (Simon, 1893) — Sri Lanka
 B. tao Ballarin & Yamasaki, 2021 — Taiwan (Orchid Is./Lanyu)
 B. trifida Lehtinen, 1981 — Borneo
 B. vitiensis Lehtinen, 1981 — Fiji
 B. vulgaris Lehtinen, 1981 — Borneo

C

Caraimatta

Caraimatta Lehtinen, 1981
 C. blandini Lehtinen, 1981 — Mexico
 C. brescoviti García, Martínez & Ahumada-C., 2019 — Colombia
 C. cambridgei (Bryant, 1940) — Cuba, Jamaica, Mexico to Panama
 C. sbordonii (Brignoli, 1972) (type) — Mexico, Guatemala

Choiroblemma

Choiroblemma Bourne, 1980
 C. bengalense Bourne, 1980 (type) — India
 C. rhinoxunum Bourne, 1980 — India

Cuangoblemma

Cuangoblemma Brignoli, 1974
 C. machadoi Brignoli, 1974 (type) — Angola

† Cymbioblemma

† Cymbioblemma Wunderlich, 2017 - Tetrablemminae

E

† Electroblemma

† Electroblemma Selden et al., 2016 - Tetrablemminae

† Eogamasomorpha

† Eogamasomorpha Wunderlich, 2008 - Tetrablemminae

F

Fallablemma

Fallablemma Shear, 1978
 F. castaneum (Marples, 1955) (type) — Samoa
 F. greenei Lehtinen, 1981 — Indonesia (Sulawesi)

G

Gunasekara

Gunasekara Lehtinen, 1981
 G. ramboda Lehtinen, 1981 (type) — Sri Lanka

H

Hexablemma

Hexablemma Berland, 1920
 H. cataphractum Berland, 1920 (type) — Kenya

I

Indicoblemma

Indicoblemma Bourne, 1980
 I. cruxi Lin & Li, 2010 — China
 I. lannaianum Burger, 2005 — Thailand
 I. monticola (Lehtinen, 1981) — Thailand
 I. sheari Bourne, 1980 (type) — India

L

Lehtinenia

Lehtinenia Tong & Li, 2008
 L. arcus Lin & Li, 2010 — China
 L. bicornis Tong & Li, 2008 (type) — China
 L. bisulcus Lin, Pham & Li, 2009 — Vietnam

† Longissithorax

† Longissithorax Wunderlich, 2017 - Tetrablemminae

† Longithorax

† Longithorax Wunderlich, 2017
 † L. furca Wunderlich, 2017

M

Maijana

Maijana Lehtinen, 1981
 M. rackae Lehtinen, 1981 (type) — Indonesia (Java)

Mariblemma

Mariblemma Lehtinen, 1981
 M. pandani (Brignoli, 1978) (type) — Seychelles

Matta

Matta Crosby, 1934
 M. angelomachadoi Brescovit, 2005 — Brazil
 M. cambito Brescovit & Cizauskas, 2019 — Brazil
 M. hambletoni Crosby, 1934 (type) — Brazil
 M. humhum Brescovit & Cizauskas, 2019 — Brazil
 M. humrrum Brescovit & Cizauskas, 2019 — Brazil
 M. mckenziei Shear, 1978 — Mexico
 M. nuusga Brescovit & Cizauskas, 2019 — Brazil
 M. pititinha Brescovit & Cizauskas, 2019 — Brazil
 M. teteia Brescovit & Cizauskas, 2019 — Brazil
 M. zuiuda Brescovit & Cizauskas, 2019 — Brazil

Micromatta

Micromatta Lehtinen, 1981
 M. atoma (Shear, 1978) (type) — Belize

Monoblemma

Monoblemma Gertsch, 1941
 M. becki Brignoli, 1978 — Brazil
 M. browni Shear, 1978 — Madagascar
 M. muchmorei Shear, 1978 — Virgin Is., Colombia
 M. unicum Gertsch, 1941 (type) — Panama
 † M. spinosum Wunderlich, 1988

P

Pahanga

Pahanga Shear, 1979
 P. centenialis Lehtinen, 1981 — Malaysia
 P. diyaluma Lehtinen, 1981 — Sri Lanka
 P. dura Shear, 1979 (type) — Malaysia
 P. lilisari Lehtinen, 1981 — Indonesia (Sumatra)

† Palpalpaculla

† Palpalpaculla Wunderlich, 2017
 † P. pulcher Wunderlich, 2017

R

Rhinoblemma

Rhinoblemma Lehtinen, 1981
 R. unicorne (Roewer, 1963) (type) — Caroline Is.

S

† Saetosoma

† Saetosoma Wunderlich, 2012
 † S. filiembolus Wunderlich, 2012

Shearella

Shearella Lehtinen, 1981
 S. alii Sankaran & Sebastian, 2016 — India
 S. lilawati Lehtinen, 1981 (type) — Sri Lanka
 S. sanya Lin & Li, 2010 — China
 S. selvarani Lehtinen, 1981 — Sri Lanka

Sinamma

Sinamma Lin & Li, 2014
 S. oxycera Lin & Li, 2014 (type) — China

Singalangia

Singalangia Lehtinen, 1981
 S. sternalis Lehtinen, 1981 (type) — Indonesia (Sumatra)

Singaporemma

Singaporemma Shear, 1978
 S. adjacens Lehtinen, 1981 — Vietnam
 S. banxiaoense Lin & Li, 2014 — China
 S. bifurcatum Lin & Li, 2010 — China
 S. halongense Lehtinen, 1981 — Vietnam
 S. lenachanae Lin & Li, 2017 — Singapore
 S. singulare Shear, 1978 (type) — Singapore
 S. takense Yan & Lin, 2018 — Thailand
 S. wulongense Lin & Li, 2014 — China

Sulaimania

Sulaimania Lehtinen, 1981
 S. brevis Lin & Li, 2017 — Singapore
 S. vigelandi Lehtinen, 1981 (type) — Malaysia

T

Tetrablemma

Tetrablemma O. Pickard-Cambridge, 1873
 T. alaus Burger, Harvey & Stevens, 2010 — Australia (Western Australia)
 T. alterum Roewer, 1963 — Micronesia
 T. benoiti (Brignoli, 1978) — Seychelles
 T. brevidens Tong & Li, 2008 — China
 T. brignolii Lehtinen, 1981 — India
 T. deccanense (Tikader, 1976) — India
 T. extorre Shear, 1978 — Trinidad
 T. helenense Benoit, 1977 — St. Helena
 T. kepense Lin, Li & Jäger, 2018 — Cambodia
 T. loebli Bourne, 1980 — India
 T. magister Burger, 2008 — Australia (Queensland)
 T. manggarai Lehtinen, 1981 — Indonesia (Flores)
 T. marawula Lehtinen, 1981 — Indonesia (Sulawesi)
 T. mardionoi Lehtinen, 1981 — Indonesia (Sumatra)
 T. medioculatum O. Pickard-Cambridge, 1873 (type) — Sri Lanka
 T. m. cochinense Lehtinen, 1981 — India
 T. m. gangeticum Lehtinen, 1981 — India
 T. menglaense Lin & Li, 2014 — China
 T. mochima Martínez, Flórez-Daza & Brescovit, 2020 — Venezuela
 T. namkhan Lin, Li & Jäger, 2012 — Laos
 T. nandan Lin & Li, 2010 — China
 T. okei Butler, 1932 — Australia (Victoria)
 T. phulchoki Lehtinen, 1981 — Nepal
 T. rhinoceros (Brignoli, 1974) — Angola
 T. samoense Marples, 1964 — Samoa
 T. sokense Lin, Li & Jäger, 2018 — Cambodia
 T. tatacoa Martínez, Flórez-Daza & Brescovit, 2020 — Colombia
 T. thamin Labarque & Grismado, 2009 — Myanmar
 T. viduum (Brignoli, 1974) — Angola
 T. vietnamense Lehtinen, 1981 — Vietnam
 T. ziyaoense Lin & Li, 2014 — China

U

† Uniscutosoma

† Uniscutosoma Wunderlich, 2015 - Tetrablemminae

References

Tetrablemmidae